Mohammad Rashid Khilji is a Pakistani politician who had been a Member of the Provincial Assembly of Sindh, from May 2013 to May 2018.

Early life and education
He was born on 12 June 1973 in Hyderabad, Pakistan.

He has a degree of Bachelor of Engineering from Mehran University of Engineering and Technology.

Political career

He was elected to the Provincial Assembly of Sindh as a candidate of Mutahida Quami Movement (MQM) from Constituency PS-46 HYDERABAD-II in 2013 Pakistani general election.

He was re-elected to Provincial Assembly of Sindh as a candidate of MQM from Constituency PS-66 (Hyderabad-V) in 2018 Pakistani general election.

References

Living people
Sindh MPAs 2013–2018
1973 births
Muttahida Qaumi Movement MPAs (Sindh)
Sindh MPAs 2018–2023